The Poker Masters is a series of high-stakes poker tournaments. Created in 2017, it takes place at ARIA Resort and Casino in Las Vegas, Nevada, and online at partypoker. Final tables are streamed on PokerGO, and the player who accumulates the most points during the series wins the Purple Jacket.

History
The first season took place in September 2017 and had five events on the schedule. Steffen Sontheimer won the $100,000 Main Event and was awarded the Purple Jacket for accumulating the most winnings after winning two events and making five final tables. For the second season, a points system was introduced to award the Purple Jacket. There were seven events on the schedule in September 2019, and David Peters won the $100,000 Main Event, while Ali Imsirovic was awarded the Purple Jacket by winning two events and making three final tables.

The third season was held in November 2019 and had ten events on the schedule. Sam Soverel won the $50,000 Main Event and was awarded the Purple Jacket after winning two events and making seven final tables. Due to the COVID-19 pandemic, the fourth season was held online at partypoker in April 2020 and had 30 events on the schedule. Linus Loeliger won the $50,000 Main Event, while Alexandros Kolonias was awarded the Purple Jacket with 11 cashes and over $1.2 million in winnings.

The fifth season was held in June 2020 on partypoker and had 16 events on the schedule that were all Pot-Limit Omaha. Isaac Haxton won the $50,000 Main Event, while Eelis Pärssinen was awarded the Purple Jacket by winning one event and cashing six times.

The sixth season was held in September 2021 at the PokerGO Studio and had 12 events on the schedule. Australian Michael Addamo won the final two events of the series including the $50,000 Main Event and was awarded the Purple Jacket and $50,000 championship bonus.

The seventh season was held in September 2022 at the PokerGO Studio and had 10 events on the schedule. Sean Winter cashed in two events including a win in Event #9 and was awarded the Purple Jacket. Jason Koon won the $50,000 Main Event.

Poker Masters Schedule 
The 2017 Poker Masters was held at ARIA Resort & Casino, and for 2018 and 2019, the event played out from the PokerGO Studio. Due to the COVID-19 pandemic, Poker Masters would move online to partypoker where there would be two series for the year. The second series would be unique with every event being Pot-Limit Omaha tournaments only.

The 2021 Poker Masters was announced by PokerGO in April 2021 with a 12-event schedule returning to the PokerGO Studio. The 2022 Poker Masters was announced by PokerGO in July 2022 with a 12-event schedule but was reduced to 10 events mid-series.

Purple Jacket winners 
The 2017 Poker Masters awarded the Purple Jacket based on total winnings for the series, but since the 2018 Poker Masters, the Purple Jacket has been awarded based on the points system used by the High Roller of the Year scoring system. For the 2021 Poker Masters, the PokerGO Tour points system was used to decide the Purple Jacket winner. The winner also received a $50,000 championship bonus.

Main Event winners

Event wins 

Information correct as of October 4, 2022.

References

External links 
Official website

Poker in Las Vegas
Television shows about poker
Recurring events established in 2017
Poker tournaments